"All or Nothing at All" is a song composed in 1939 by Arthur Altman, with lyrics by Jack Lawrence.

Frank Sinatra recording
Frank Sinatra's August 31, 1939 recording of the song, accompanied by Harry James and his Orchestra was a huge hit in 1943, when it was reissued by Columbia Records during the 1942-44 musicians' strike. The record topped the Billboard charts in 1943 during a 21-week stay and sold over a million copies. On the Harlem Hit Parade chart, "All or Nothing at All" went to number eight.

References

External links
Entry on songfacts.com

Songs with music by Arthur Altman
Songs with lyrics by Jack Lawrence
Frank Sinatra songs
1939 songs
1940 singles
1943 singles
Jazz compositions in A minor